Mavelikkara is a taluk and municipality in the Onattukara region of Alappuzha district in the Indian state of Kerala. Located in the southern part of the district on the banks of the Achankovil River.

Etymology
The name Mavelikara is believed to be turned out from the words Maveli or Mahabali, the mythical king of Kerala, and Kara means land. This land is believed to be the place 'Mattom Mahadeva temple'where king Mahabali knelt before Vamana, offering his head for Vamana to keep his feet.

Background
The town boasts about a rich historical and cultural background. The Chettikulangara Devi Temple, known for the Kumbha Bharani festival is located near the municipality. The place is home to one of the 108 Shiva temples of Kerala created by Lord Parashurama, the Kandiyoor Mahadeva Temple. It was also a major centre of trade and commerce in ancient Kerala and the erstwhile capital of the rulers of Onattukara. As a result of the close association with the Travancore Royal Family, Mavelikkara gained modern facilities well ahead of other places in the state. It is one of the oldest municipalities of the state. Even before India attained independence, Mavelikara had a super express transport service to Trivandrum.

Demographics 
As of 2011 Census, Mavelikara had a population of 26,421 with 12,070 males and 14,351 females. The average female sex ratio was 1189 higher than the state average of 1084. 7.7% of the population was under 6 years of age. Mavelikara had an average literacy of 96.9% higher than the state average of 94%: male literacy was 97.8% and female literacy was 96.2%.

Transport

Bus 
Kerala State Road Transport Corporation has a sub depot at Mavelikkara (Station Code: MVKA) which is one among the 46 sub depots in the state. The KSRTC sub depot at Mavelikkara has an inter state bus service which is operated to Tenkasi every day; 2 trips morning & evening via Kayamkulam, Kattanam.

The Municipal Private bus stand is located at Mitchel Junction with buses to Chengannur, Pathanamthitta, Adoor, Pandalam, Thiruvalla, Haripad, Kayamkulam, Changanassery.

Rail 
Main article : Mavelikara railway station

Mavelikara railway station (Station Code:MVLK) is a mainline station in the Trivandrum Division of the Southern Railway Zone (India), with connections to New Delhi, Mumbai, Chennai, Kolkata, Bangalore, Hyderabad, Ahmedabad, Pune, Mangalore, Bhopal, Guwahati, Nagpur and Jammu. Other nearby stations are Kayamkulam Junction railway station, Chengannur Railway Station, Haripad railway station and Kollam Junction railway station.

Air 
The nearest airports are Trivandrum International Airport115 km and Cochin International Airport (CIAL).127 km
State highway SH 10 road start in mavelikara

Economy 
Local industries in and around Mavelikkara include:
 KSRTC Regional Workshop and Bus Body Building Centre Mavelikkara
 ALIND Switchgear, Mannar
Several small-scale industries are present in the Industrial Estate (an initiative of SIDCO) located at Kollakadavu.

Politics

Lok Sabha 

Mavelikara has its own constituency in the Lok Sabha. Until the 2002 Lok Sabha Delimitation took effect in 2008, the constituency consisted of Chengannur, Mavelikara, Kayamkulam, Pandalam, Thiruvalla and Kallupara. Since then, the assembly constituencies have comprised Changanassery, Kuttanad, Mavelikara (SC), Chengannur, Kunnathur (SC), Kottarakkara and Pathanapuram. The constituency is now reserved for a scheduled caste candidate.

Kodikunnil Suresh of the INC has represented the Mavelikkara constituency since 2009.

State Assembly 

M.S Arunkumar from the CPI(M) is the representative of Mavelikkara in the Kerala Legislative Assembly.

Culture 

The cultural capital of Alappuzha is Mavelikkara. Mavelikara was once part of the principality of Onattukara and has been a centre of religious harmony, culture and arts for several centuries.

As a testament to its link to that flourishing centre of Buddhist culture, Mavelikkara is one of the rare places in Kerala where one can find the Statue of Buddha in Seated Position, which dates back to the 9th century AD.
Mar Ivanios, the pioneer of the Reunion Movement is from this holy socio-cultural land. He is from the Medayil Panicker Family situated at the center of the Mavelikara Town.

Notable people 

 Abu Abraham, cartoonist and writer
 P. C. Alexander, principal Secretary to former Prime Ministers Indira Gandhi and Rajiv Gandhi
 Zacharias Athanasios, 3rd Bishop of Tiruvalla - Cherian Polachirackal, originally from Mavelikkara
 Ramesh Chennithala, home minister, leader of the Opposition in the Kerala Legislative Assembly
 Ramayyan Dalawa, the chief minister and friend of marthandavarma- the kavu in front of municipal office is in his name
 Archbishop Aboon Geevarghese Ivanios, founding father of the Syro–Malankara Catholic Church
 T. K. Madhavan, Reformist leader of modern Kerala
 Mavelikkara Velukkutty Nair,  Carnatic mridangam player
 Geevarghese Osthathios, Bishop of Malankara Orthodox Syrian Church, theologian, orator and writer
 Rahul Panicker, award-winning innovator, entrepreneur, scientist
 Divya Pillai, actress
 Mavelikkara Ponnamma, actress
 Narendra Prasad, college professor, actor, author
 Mavelikkara S. R. Raju, Carnatic mridangam player
Justice C.T Ravikumar,Judge Supreme Court of India
 C. M. Stephen, Leader of Congress and the INTUC, he is the first opposition leader of congress.
 P. G. N. Unnithan, the last Diwan (Prime Minister) of independent Travancore
 M. S. Valiathan cardiac surgeon, former President of the Indian National Science Academy and National Research Professor
 A. R. Raja Raja Varma, grammarian and poet
 Mavelikkara Prabhakara Varma, Carnatic singer
 Raja Ravi Varma, artist 
 Ravindra Varma, minister for Labour and Parliamentary Affairs in the Morarji Desai Ministry in India from 1977 to 1979
 R. Marthanda Varma, India's first neurosurgeon and developer of a surgical technique for treating Parkinson's disease
 Vishnupriya- Malayalam film actress 
 Yesudasan, cartoonist

Places of worship

 Chettikulangara Devi Temple, founded in AD 823, is a Bhagawathy Temple. The major festival is Chettikulangara Kumbha Bharani.
 Maha ganapathi temple,Pela
 Kannamangalam south mahadevar temple.
 Malimel bhagavathi temple, Kurathikad, Mavelikkara 
 Ponnaramthottam Bhadra Durga Devi Temple near Power House and Court Mavelikara (Ponnaramthotam Patham udayam festival is famous)
 Mattom Mahadeva Temple also known as (SHIVA NADA) this temple founded in AD 832
 Sri Maruthakshi Devi temple, Mavelikara
 Thiruvairoor Sree Mahadevar Temple, Chunakkara, "Sarwam Swayambhoo Temple"
 Kandiyoor Sree Mahadeva Temple, also known as Dakshina Kashi Founded in AD 731
 Sree Krishna Swami Temple 
 Malimel Bhagavathi Temple, Kurathikad
 St . Marys Orthodox Cathedral, Puthiyacavu (Mavelikkara) Founded in AD 934
 C.S.I. Christ Church
 St.Joseph Malankara Catholic Church, Puthiyakavu-Mother Parish of Late Archbishop Servant of God Geevarghese Mar Ivanios
 St.Marys Malankara Catholic Church (Bethany Pally), kallumala
 St. John's Orthodox Valiyapally, Pathichira - St. John the Baptist, Thattarambalam P.O., Mavelikara - 690103
 St. George Orthodox Church, Karipuzha - St. George, Thattarambalam P.O., Mavelikara - 690103
 Immanuel Church of God (Full Gospel), Erezha South, Chettikulangara.690106
 St. Andrew's Marthoma Church, Kaitha North, Chettikulangara. 690106
 Parimanam Marthoma Church, Parimanam
 Indian Pentecostal Church of God (IPC) Bethel, Vadakkethundam, Kannamangalam South, Karipuzha Road, Chettikulangara. 690106
 Christian Worship Centre (Pentecostal Church), Kaitha North, Chettikulangara P.O., Mavelikara - 690106
 Cherukole Marthoma Church, Cherukole
 St. Peter's Marthoma Church, Chennithala
 Thazhakara Mar Thoma Church, Mavelikara.
 Mannalill Bhagavati Temple. Arunoottimangalam mavelikara
 Ramanallor Vishnu Temple, Vettiyar Mavelikara
 Shree Parabhramodya Temple, Varenickal
 Hanuman temple karayamvattam , Mavelikara

Educational organizations

 Bishop Hodges Higher Secondary School, Mavelikkara
 Bishop Moore College, Kallumala, Mavelikkara
 Bishop Moore Vidyapith, Mavelikkara
 CNPPM Vocational High School, Kattachira
 Jawahar Navodaya Vidyalaya, Chennithala
 Peet Memorial Training College, Mavelikkara 
 Raja Ravi Varma College of Fine Arts, Mavelikkara

Hospitals
Govt.hospital, Mavelikara
VSM hospital
Sreekandapuram hospital
Meepallikutti hospital

See also 
 Charummood
 Chettikulangara
 Karunagappalli
 Mannar
 Mavelikkara (Lok Sabha constituency)
 Kattanam
 Padanilam
 Thriperumthura
 Vallikunnam

References

External links 

 Official website of Mavelikkara taluk

 Shappil House - Ancient Family in Mavelikara

Cities and towns in Alappuzha district